Rijeka Airport is the international airport serving Rijeka, Croatia. It is located near the town of Omišalj on the island of Krk, 17 km from the Rijeka railway station. Most of the traffic to and from the airport occurs during the summer months, when it is used by several European low-cost airlines flying tourists to the northern parts of the Croatian coast.

History
Rijeka airport opened in May 1970. The first plane to depart carried Josip Broz Tito and his wife.

Before the Second World War, Rijeka was divided between Yugoslavia and Italy. The Yugoslav part of the city was served by the airfield in Sušak.  Domestic airline Aeroput opened a route linking Sušak to Zagreb in 1930, and a year later, a route linking Zagreb to Belgrade via Sušak, Split and Sarajevo was opened. By 1936, Aeroput linked the city to Belgrade, Borovo, Ljubljana, Sarajevo, Split and Zagreb. The Italian part of the city was connected to many Italian cities with regular flights provided by Italian company Ala Littoria.

The Grobnik airport had difficulty with larger planes, as its runways were close to the hills to the east of the city. With larger airliners coming on board, planners decided on a location on Krk after considering locations close to Opatija and near Urinj, which would have required moving some hills.

Facilities 
Rijeka airport has a single terminal building which dates back to its original opening in 1970. Over the decades minor upgrades have been made. Terminal has 7 gates, 1 domestic and 6 international. None of the gates have jet bridges and boarding is done by people walking from the terminal directly to the aircraft. Arrivals hall features a single baggage belt. On the upper floor there is a small duty free in the international area, mostly featuring local produced merchandise, as well as a café bar. Another bar with limited selection of snacks is located on before in the entrance hall. Domestic departures have no facilities after security check. Several car rental agencies maintain their offices during the summer season.

Airport has a single 2500 m long and 45 m wide runway. As there are no taxiways, airplane has to turn at the runway end and taxi along the runway back to the terminal. Runway 14 has CAT I ILS landing aids installed.

Ground transportation 
Since the airport is located on the island of Krk, there is a dedicated bus line from Rijeka and Omišalj which runs as needed, considering the flight arrival times. In case there are no bookings made 24 hours prior to departure the shuttle will not operate.

Airlines and destinations
The following airlines operate regular scheduled and charter flights at Rijeka Airport:

Statistics

Incidents and accidents
 On 23 May 1971, Aviogenex Flight 130 crashed on approach to Rijeka Airport because of rough landing in bad weather conditions, killing 78 people and leaving five survivors. Among the victims was the famous Croatian poet Josip Pupačić with his wife and daughter.

References

External links

 Official website

Airports in Croatia
Airport
Krk
Buildings and structures in Primorje-Gorski Kotar County
Economy of Rijeka
Transport in Primorje-Gorski Kotar County
Tourism in Rijeka